Alva Ross "AJ" Kitt IV (born September 13, 1968) is a former World Cup alpine ski racer from the United States.  A member of the U.S. Ski Team for over a decade, Kitt specialized in the speed event of downhill, and also raced in Super-G and combined. He retired from international competition following the 1998 season with six World Cup podiums, which included one downhill victory. Kitt was a bronze medalist in the downhill at the 1993 World Championships. He also had the lead in three World Cup races which were subsequently nullified by FIS officials, due to weather conditions that did not allow the entire field of competitors to start the race. In each, Kitt was awarded the race's prize money and trophies, but not the World Cup points.

Early life 
Born and raised in Rochester in western New York, Kitt started skiing at two years of age at nearby Swain Resort, where his parents, Ross and Nancy, were part-time ski instructors. Kitt began racing at age 6 and raced in the Genesee Valley Ski Council until age 14. In 1983 he began attending a ski academy in Lake Placid, the Mountain House School. Two years later as a high school junior, Kitt transferred to Green Mountain Valley School in Waitsfield, Vermont, where he graduated in 1986. During a post-graduate year training and racing as part of what is considered the first privateer ski team in U.S. history, Kitt and many of his training team members were selected to the U.S. Ski Team's National Training Group, the development team.

In only his first full season of World Cup racing in 1988, Kitt made the U.S. team at age 19 for the 1988 Winter Olympics at Calgary. He was the first American male alpine skier to compete in four Olympics, later passed by Bode Miller. Kitt is said to have "breathed life into a stagnant U.S. Ski team" when he won his first World Cup race in Val d'Isere, France, on December 7, 1991. It was the first victory of any kind for an American male in seven years. He spent much of the 1992 season ranked in the top five in the downhill standings, and finished strong at the end of the season to take third overall, the best season for an American downhiller at the time. He finished ninth in the downhill at the 1992 Winter Olympics, held on a different course than his World Cup victory two months prior.

In 1993, Kitt won the bronze medal at the World Championships in Morioka, Japan. He joined Doug Lewis as the only American men to win a World Championship medal in downhill. He was challenging for another medal in the combined, but missed a gate in the slalom's second run, hiked back up and finished 28th. During the 1990s, Kitt won four titles at the U.S. Alpine Championships.

Early in the 1996 season, he crashed hard in a downhill training run in early December at Val-d'Isère, the site of his only World Cup win four years earlier. He suffered a torn anterior cruciate ligament (ACL), along with other associated damage to his left knee, which ended his season, including the World Championships in Sierra Nevada, Spain. After surgery and six months of rehabilitation, Kitt returned for the 1997 season. The remainder of his career saw only one top-10 result, several top-20s and plenty of frustration. Kitt battled chronic back injuries in his final two seasons and retired in March 1998.

World Cup results

Season standings

Race podiums
1 win – (1 DH)
6 podiums – (5 DH, 1 SG), and 21 top tens

World Championships results

 The U.S. team missed the Super-G in 1991 due to the Gulf War.
 The Super-G in 1993 was cancelled after multiple weather delays.

Olympic results  
Kitt competed in four Winter Olympics; his best finish was ninth place in the downhill at Val-d'Isère in 1992.

Post career 
Kitt continues to support ski racing in many forms. The Kitt Cup is a season long race series which takes place at the Swain ski resort where he first began his training.He has been the traveling NASTAR pacesetter since 1999, and continues to provide race coaching. Kitt also gives inspirational guest speaking engagements to youth ski racers everywhere.

Kitt resides in Hood River, Oregon.   He currently coaches U14 skiers for the Meadows Race Team  at Mt. Hood Meadows.

References

External links

 A J Kitt World Cup standings at the International Ski Federation
 
 
 Sports Illustrated – cover – 1992-01-27

American male alpine skiers
Alpine skiers at the 1988 Winter Olympics
Alpine skiers at the 1992 Winter Olympics
Alpine skiers at the 1994 Winter Olympics
Alpine skiers at the 1998 Winter Olympics
Olympic alpine skiers of the United States
Sportspeople from Boulder, Colorado
Sportspeople from Rochester, New York
1968 births
Living people